Lake Sinoe is a lagoon in Northern Dobruja, Romania, close to the Black Sea. Its name derives from Slavic (Blue Lake). The ruins of the ancient Greek colony of Histria are located on the lake shore.

See also 
 Sinoe oil field located on the continental shelf of the Black Sea, discovered in 1991 and developed by Petrom.
 Sinoê an Arcadian nymph associated with the Roman deity Pan

External links
 Map
 Razim-Sinoe "Biosphere Roadmap" poster from Norwegian Geotechnical Institute (NGI) international centre for geoscience research and consulting
 Razim-Sinoe Case Study complete 48-page report from Norwegian Geotechnical Institute (NGI) international centre for geoscience research consultants on the Danube Delta Reserve

Lakes of Constanța County
Lagoons of Romania